Gregory IV was Ecumenical Patriarch of Constantinople for two months in 1623.

Life
Before he was elected as Patriarch of Constantinople, Gregory IV was Metropolitan of Amasya. At the time of his election, he was old and blind in one eye, and so he was given the sobriquet Stravoamaseias, i.e. the blind of Amasya.

His short reign has to be considered in the context of the clash between the pro-Calvinist Patriarch Cyril Lucaris, supported by the Protestant Dutch and English ambassadors to the Ottoman capital, and his opponents supported by the Catholic French, Austrian and Venetian ambassadors. The latter were successful at persuading the Grand Vizier to depose Cyril Lucaris on 12 April 1623 and to appoint in his place Gregory IV, the head of the pro-Western faction.

Eugenia Kermeli reports, "In 1623, the metropolitan of Amaseia Gregory promised [the French ambassador] Cécy to appoint metropolitans friendly to Rome in case he was elected."

Gregory IV proved to be incompetent and could not pay the appointment fee (peshtesh) due to the Ottoman Sultan. Further the Metropolitans and the bishops were unsatisfied with him because he had not been canonically elected by the Holy Synod. Thus, on 18 June 1623, the Holy Synod deposed Gregory IV and formally elected Anthimus II in his place.

After his deposition, Gregory IV was exiled to the island of Rhodes. The date of his death is not known.

References

Sources
 

16th-century births
17th-century deaths
17th-century Ecumenical Patriarchs of Constantinople
Simony